Vermillion is the fourth and last album by The Three O'Clock, released in 1988. It was released on Paisley Park Records - the label started by Prince. It also included a song written by Prince called "Neon Telephone".

Track listing
Side A
"Vermillion" - 0.38
"Love Explosion" - 4.01
"To Be Where You Are" - 3.55
"When She Becomes My Girl" - 3.30
"World On Fire" - 3.31
"Neon Telephone" - 3.57
Side B 
"On Paper" - 4.02
"Ways Of Magic" - 4.08
"Time's Going Slower" - 3.19
"Love Has No Heart" - 4.24
"Through The Sleepy Town" - 6.02

Personnel
Danny Benair - drums, vocals
Jason Falkner - guitar, vocals
Mike Mariano - keyboards, vocals
Michael Quercio - lead vocals, bass guitar

References

The band also recorded: Covers that are unreleased. Make It Easy On Yourself (Falkner vocal) Ticket To Ride, and He's On The Beach, plus a long fake jazz track on downtime..There is also a band made documentary by Danny Benair and Jason Falkner of the making of the record.

1988 albums
The Three O'Clock albums